Deidamia or Deidameia or Laodamia (died 233 BC
) was the Queen regnant of Epirus in 234 - 233 BC. She was the daughter of Pyrrhus II of Epirus, king of Epirus. 

After the death of her father and that of her uncle Ptolemy, she was the last surviving representative of the royal Aeacid dynasty in Epirus.

She had a sister, Nereis, who married Gelo of Syracuse. During a rebellion in Epirus, her sister sent her 800 Gaulish mercenaries. Part of the Molossians supported her, and with the aid of the mercenaries she briefly took Ambracia. 

When the Epirots sued for peace as suppliants, she granted it only on condition that they acknowledged her hereditary rights, and the honours of her ancestors. But some of the Epirots plotted against her and bribed Nestor, one of Alexander's guards, to murder her. Nestor returned without accomplishing his purpose and she fled for refuge in the temple of Artemis Hegemone, but was murdered in the sanctuary by Milon, a man already responsible of killing his own mother Philotera who shortly after this crime committed suicide. According to Polyaenus, she said to Milon before he murdered her: "Slaughter, thou matricide, on slaughter raise".

The date of this event cannot be accurately fixed, but it occurred during the reign of Demetrius II in Macedonia (239–229 BC).

References

Smith, William (editor); Dictionary of Greek and Roman Biography and Mythology, "Deidameia (2)", Boston, (1867)

Notes

3rd-century BC Greek people
3rd-century BC women rulers
233 BC deaths
Rulers of Ancient Epirus
Year of birth unknown
Women in ancient Greek warfare